The Columbia Pike–Farragut Square Line, designated Route 16Y, is a rush hour-only MetroExtra bus route operated by the Washington Metropolitan Area Transit Authority between the neighborhood of Barcroft and McPherson Square station of the Blue, Orange, and Silver lines of the Washington Metro. This line is part of the Pike Ride service, which runs through Columbia Pike. This line provides service to Barcroft in Arlington County, Virginia and McPherson Square in Washington, D.C.

Route description and service

The 16Y operates from Four Mile Run Division every 20 - 24 minutes from 6:00 AM – 8:40 AM and 4:00 PM – 7:12 PM on weekdays during rush hours. 16Y trips travel in both directions during weekday rush hours. During morning 16Y trips, D.C. stops can only be alighted; during afternoon 16Y trips, D.C. stops can only be boarded. The 16Y serves limited stops in Virginia, bringing faster service on Columbia Pike. The 16Y splits service from Columbia Pike to head towards Lyon Park from South Courthouse Road towards Arlington Boulevard (U.S. Route 50), all the way to D.C. via the Arlington Memorial Bridge. Route 16Y is the only MetroExtra route that serves Virginia. Local Columbia Pike service is provided by Routes 16A, 16C, and 16E & Routes 16G, and 16H. Local bus service is also provided on Arlington Transit Routes 42, 45, and 77 through the neighborhood of Lyon Park, and the Pershing Drive–Arlington Boulevard Line (Route 4A) through Arlington Boulevard up to Rosslyn.

History

Route 16Y began service on September 29, 2002, becoming the first bus route to run through Downtown D.C. since the opening of the Yellow Line in 1983. The 16Y was also created by WMATA to provide limited stop/ express service between the neighborhood of Barcroft and McPherson Square station via Columbia Pike, Arlington Boulevard, and the Arlington Memorial Bridge. The original 16Y route serves limited stops on Columbia Pike between South Four Mile Run Drive, and South Courthouse road, until it runs non stop to Downtown, serving all stops until McPherson Square station. The 16Y serves Farragut Square Station, both the North and the West side, before arriving to McPherson Square.

The 16Y became part of the Pike Ride route in 2003, along with the other 16 lines. As part of the Pike Ride project, the 16Y brings in more faster service during rush hours through Columbia Pike.

The 16Y became a MetroExtra route in 2012, along with route 16F (later 16X) of the Columbia Pike–Federal Triangle Line. This groups the 16Y, as a limited stop routes, while all other 16 lines are local routes which serves all stops in Columbia Pike. Along with the addition of MetroExtra Better Bus program, it brings more reliable service on the 16Y when more times was added throughout the years.

April 7, 2003 Changes

Starting on April 7, 2003, the 16Y added service to the Arlington County Department of Human Services (DHS)/Sequoia at South Courthouse Road and 2nd Street South. This stop became a "Boarding Only" during morning peak periods, and "Boarding and Alighting Only" during afternoon peak periods. From the addition of the stop, the 16Y eliminated the alighting only stop at the neighborhood of Penrose on Columbia Pike, as the 16Y will no longer run on Washington Boulevard, south of Walter Reed Drive.

June 27, 2010 Changes

The 16Y began to add more service through South Courthouse Road. The 16Y started to serve on the intersection of 6th Street South to bring more stops to the route. As the DHS/Sequoia stop at 2nd Street South is a Boarding Only stop on morning peak period, this new stop allows access to DHS/Sequoia by walking.

September 30, 2012 Changes

The 16Y began to add service through Lyon Park and Fort Myer near Arlington Boulevard, by adding more stops to bring more service on the 16Y. The DHS/Sequoia stop is no longer a Boarding Only stop on morning peak hours, after service on Washington Boulevard and Arlington Boulevard was added. Alongside these changes, the 16Y now operates near Fort Myer on Arlington Boulevard and North Pershing Drive. Unlike its original timetable, this stop is both Boarding and Alighting during peak hours.

September 2020 proposed changes 
On September 10, 2020 as part of its FY2022 proposed budget, WMATA proposed to eliminate route 16Y service in order to reduce costs and low federal funds. If this proposal succeeds, there will be no MetroExtra routes left in Virginia. Route 16Y has not operated since March 13, 2020 due to Metro's response to the COVID-19 pandemic.

September 2021 changes 
WMATA announced to restore the 16Y line on September 5, 2021, due to frequency improvements in the Metrobus system. The restoration of the 16Y will resume operation as it was during the pre-pandemic levels, with additional peak trips for both directions, with new trips serving Barcroft during morning rush hours, and McPherson Square station during afternoon rush hours apart from the original peak directional trips.

References

2002 establishments in Virginia
Transport infrastructure completed in 2002
16Y